Antilophia is a genus of South American birds in the manakin family Pipridae.

Taxonomy
The genus Antilophia was introduced in 1850 by the German naturalist Ludwig Reichenbach to accommodate the helmeted manakin. The genus name combines the Ancient Greek antios meaning "different" with lophoeis meaning "crested".

The genus contains the following two species:

References

 
Bird genera
Taxonomy articles created by Polbot
Taxa named by Ludwig Reichenbach